Mohammed Raja'a Abdel Mo'min Al-Naqqash (Arabic: رجاء النقاش), often referred to simply as Raja'a Al-Naqqash, was an Egyptian literary critic, intellectual, and journalist. A graduate of the Department of Arabic Language in Cairo University. Raja'a became a journalist, then editor, covering the modern literary scene of Egypt during its most formative years. He retired in 2008, continuing to write actively on literary topics he had focused on throughout his career.

Works 

 Original Works
 ʻAbāqirah wa-majānīn (عباقرة ومجانين) Geniuses and Nutcases
 Taʼammulāt fī al-insān
 Abū al-Qāsim al-Shabbī : shāʻir al-ḥubb wa-al-thawrah : dirāsat wa-mukhtārāt
 Ṣafaḥāt majhulah fī al-adab al-ʻArabī al-Muʻāṣir
 al-Inʻizālīyūn fī Miṣr : radd ʻalá Luwīs ʻAwaḍ wa-Tawfīq al-Ḥakīm wa-ākharīn 
 Lughz Umm Kulthūm, wa-kalimāt ukhrá
 ʻAbbās al-ʻAqqād bayna al-yamīn wa-al-yasār
 Maḥmūd Darwīsh : shāʻir al-arḍ al-muḥtallah
 Thalāthūn ʻāman maʻa al-shiʻr wa-al-shuʻarāʼ : dirāsāt 
 Fī ḥubb Najīb Maḥfūẓ / Rajāʼ al-Naqqāsh 
 Qiṣṣat riwāyatayn : dirāsah naqdīyah wa-fikrīyah li-riwāyat Dhākirat al-jasad wa-riwāyat, Walīmah li-aʻshāb al-baḥr ; maʻa baḥth ʻan athar al-ḥizbīyah al-siyāsīyah fī al-adab 
 Najīb Maḥfūz : safaḥāt min mudhakkirātihi wa-aḍwāʼ jadīdah ʻalá adabihi wa-ḥayātih 
 نزار قباني : أجمل قصائدنا العربية / تقديم محمد عبد المنعم ؛ المشاركون رجاء النقاش
 Translations
 Victoria, written in Hebrew by Sami Michael

References

External links 

 Abdel Rahman, Mahfouz. "The Jeweler: Mahfouz Abdel Rahman on Raja'a Al-Naqqash and The Days With Him". Al-Araby. February 18, 2008.

2008 deaths
Egyptian journalists